Tahar Sfar (November 15, 1903 – August 9, 1942) was a Tunisian lawyer and politician.

Early life and education 

Sfar studied brilliantly in College Sadiki before enrolling himself in Lycée Carnot of Tunis. After obtaining his baccalaureate, he was proposed the management and reform of the school of El Arfania, in Tunis. He went to Paris in October 1925 to study law, Literature and political science. There, he found his friends from Sadiki such as Habib Bourguiba, Mahmoud El Materi, Bahri Guiga, Mustapha Baffoun and Sadok Boussofara.

Among his French classmates in Law school was the future French Prime Minister Edgar Faure. Indeed, Faure testified in his memoirs that during the first meeting he had with Habib Bourguiba in April 1955, he started recalling his student memories in Paris and wrote: "I told him about his compatriot Tahar Sfar who collected awards in the end of year contest where I collected honorable accessits...".

Furthermore, Sfar also created, in the end of 1927, with a group of Tunisian, Algerian and Moroccan student fellows, the Muslim Students Association of North Africa, in which he became the first vice-president.

Nationalist activist 

He returned to Tunis in 1928 to start working as a lawyer in parallel with numerous other activities: Political economy lessons in El-Khaldounia and writing newspaper articles in Arabic or French, such as La Voix du Tunisien and L'Action Tunisienne, which he founded with Bourguiba, El Materi and Guiga, in 1932. He also was active in struggling for independence, among the Destour party then created the Neo Destour with L'Action team, during the Ksar Hellal Congress of March 2, 1932.

The new party wanted itself to be modernist in its methods and organization, but at the same time, educator and mobilizer of the low classes for a better awareness of the need to rid the country of colonialism. Sfar was a great friend of Bourguiba, with whom he liked discussing philosophy, his passionate subject. Sfar greatly admired Mohandas Karamchand Gandhi and, just like him, advocated for nonviolence. The Neo Destour activists often referred to him as the philosopher of the party.

Imprisonment 

In January 1935, Sfar was removed under house arrest in Zarzis, in the Tunisian south, along with Guiga and Salah Ben Youssef. Thus, they joined their Neo Destour mates, taken away in the South since the September 1934 colonial repression. Sfar benefited from his isolation to study law and literature and also write a sort of journal, published in 1960, after his death, titled "Journal of an exiled" with a preface by André Demeerseman, manager of Ibla newspaper in Tunis. Demeerseman attended some of Tahar Sfar's political economy classes in El-Khaldounia, at the beginnings of 1930s.

After the arrival of Armand Guillon, the new resident-general of France in Tunisia, Sfar was freed in April 1936 at the same time as the other members of the party leadership. The negotiations between Guillon and the nationalists proved to be ephemeral. Sfar was imprisoned after the 1938 political crisis, even though he was part, at the time, of the party's moderates. At the end of April 1939, he left prison with serious health problems and died on August 9, 1942. Before he died, Sfar published in the French feminist journal Leïla of December 1939 an article strongly denouncing Adolf Hitler's regime and explaining the danger that he represented for humanity. This article was titled "The racist concepts of Hitler". At the end of this article and after introducing readers to some significant quotations of Mein Kampf, he ended his critical analysis with the following conclusion:

Political positions 

Struggling for the independence of his country, Tahar Sfar also advocated for a real cooperation between the Eastern and Western world, as he wrote in the early 1930s: "Peace in the future, progress of the entire humanity depend on this union, this narrow collaboration between East and West, who, instead of turning their backs on themselves, ignore themselves, ought, on the contrary, support each other, provide mutual aid and cooperation for the rehabilitation of the fate of humanity.

In an article published by Leïla magazine in January 1941 and titled "What is a civilization?", Sfar developed his own definition of civilization and concluded by writing:

Family 

Tahar Sfar was the son of Mustapha Sfar, a notary in Mahdia. Tahar Sfar married a cousin, Salha Sfar, daughter of the notary Mohamed Sfar, in 1929. He had three children: two daughters, Zeineb and Najet, and a son, Rachid Sfar, future Prime minister of Tunisia under Habib Bourguiba, from 1986–87.

Footnotes and References

Bibliography

In French 
 Khaled Abid, Tahar Sfar le militant, éd. Institut supérieur de l'histoire du mouvement national, Tunis, 2003
 André Demeerseman, « Tahar Sfar », Ibla, 1960, 
 André Demeerseman, Là-bas... à Zarzis et maintenant, éd. Maison tunisienne de l'édition, Tunis, 1969
 Youssef Remadi, Tahar Sfar. Le leader et le penseur, fils de Mahdia, éd. El Bustan, Tunis, 2007
 Tahar Sfar, Journal d'un exilé, éd. Bouslama, Tunis, 1960
 Hassen Sioud, Tahar Sfar. Le militant et le penseur, éd. Imprimerie El Hilal, 1982
 Abdelhafid Zouari, Tahar Sfar, le penseur, éd. Imprimerie El Alam, Sousse, 2004

20th-century Tunisian lawyers
Tunisian politicians
1903 births
1942 deaths
Alumni of Sadiki College